One Page of Love is a 1978 French-Belgian film directed by Maurice Rabinowicz. It was entered into the 28th Berlin International Film Festival.

Cast
 Ève Bonfanti - Anna
 Adrian Brine - Policier
 Geraldine Chaplin - Lise
 Alexandra Clabots - Grand-mère
 Marcel Dalio - Père de Fanny
 Jan Decleir - Ouvrier
 Pierre Dumaine - Infirmier
 Sami Frey - François Karwitch
 Niusia Gold - Mère
 Zelman Koletshnikov - Père de François
 Severyn Lipszyc - Oncle
 Esther Loszica - Belle-soeur
 Monette Loza - Fanny

References

External links

1978 films
French drama films
Belgian drama films
1970s French-language films
Films directed by Maurice Rabinowicz
French-language Belgian films
1970s French films